Presidential elections were held in the Comoros on 7 November 2010, with a second round on 26 December, alongside gubernatorial elections for the three main islands. The result was a victory for Ikililou Dhoinine, who received 61% of the vote.

Background
There had been an attempt to delay the elections until 27 November 2011 and extend the presidential term until then. However, the Constitutional Court ruled this unconstitutional in May 2010.

Electoral system
In Comoros, the presidency rotates every four years between the federation's three constituent islands: Anjouan, Mohéli and Grande Comore. This rotation was Mohéli's turn to supply the president. Incumbent president Ahmed Abdallah Sambi was from Anjouan, and was thus not able to stand as a candidate.

The president was elected in two rounds; in the first round, voters in Mohéli voted in a primary election, with the top three candidates advancing to the second round, where a nationwide vote was carried out, with the winner decided by plurality voting.

Candidates
There were ten candidates in the presidential primary election. President Sambi supported his Vice President Ikililou Dhoinine. Another candidate from the Presidential Movement was Mohamed Larifou Oukacha, secretary-general of the presidency, showing a possible split in the Presidential faction. The other eight candidates were from the opposition. Among them were Mohamed Said Fazul, former governor of Mohéli, and Zahariat Saïd Ahmed, the sole female candidate.

Results
Ikililou Dhoinine, Mohamed Said Fazul and Bianrifi Tarmidhi received the most votes in the first round primary. However, Tarmidhi's total number of votes was cut down on 13 November by the constitutional court after it had decided to invalidate the ballots from several polling stations. This meant that, besides Dhoinine and Fazul, Abdou Djabir advanced to the second round.

References

Presidential elections in the Comoros
Comoros
2010 in the Comoros